Drepanopeziza sphaerioides is a species of fungi belonging to the family Drepanopezizaceae.

Synonym: Marssonina salicicola (Bres.) Magnus, 1906

References

Helotiales